Preston Crossing is a big box shopping area (or "power centre") in Saskatoon, Saskatchewan, Canada.  It is located at Preston Avenue North and Circle Drive.

History
Preston Crossing's development coincided with the construction of an overpass over Circle Drive linking Attridge Drive to a realigned Preston Avenue North.  of land, owned by the University of Saskatchewan, was marked for commercial development. The university paid for the initial water, sewer and roadway construction; in exchange, it leases the land to retail tenants and the revenue goes into its Land Endowment Fund. Preston Avenue bisects the property and is its major access road; a secondary access utilizing the original north/south Preston roadway alignment, allows access from eastbound Circle Drive.

Calgary-based Rencor Developments formed a joint venture called Preston Crossing Properties Inc. with two Saskatchewan companies, Harvard Developments and TGS Properties. It completed all development, leasing and financing for the project; the architecture mirrored the gothic elements of the University campus buildings. In the fall of 2005, Harvard gained sole acquisition of the shopping center.

Construction began in the spring of 2002 and the first stores opened in the fall of the same year Future Shop (now Best Buy) relocated from it original Circle Centre Mall Across The Street From The Centre Mall where Jysk stands today, in 2003 Canadian Tire Relocated from its Centre Mall Location which had been there since its 1986 relocation from its original Market Mall location, it was announced back in 2004 that a new state of the art Wal*Mart would open on the north west corner of the mall replacing its Centre Mall location construction started in late August 2004 and completed in January 2005 the store opened and the one in Centre Mall closed after 10 and a half years. Development has continued in phases, although full build-out has not yet been reached. As of 2010, three building phases have been completed; a fourth phase was announced in June 2010. The shopping area had already lost one of its originating tenants, with the Shoppers Drug Mart location going out of business in 2012, after 10 years of operation.

By 2013, a booming economy and low retail vacancy rate prompted plans for Preston Crossing to expand further. The property developer asked for restrictions on the size and types of businesses to be lifted. The restrictions had been implemented over unrealized concerns that the big box complex would take business away from other commercial districts like 8th Street, Broadway Avenue and downtown.

In 2014, a deal was signed to build the fifth and final phase of Preston Crossing, utilizing the last of the available land. The new buildings were completed by the spring of 2017.

Stores
Six stores are considered as anchors:
Canadian Tire
Sobeys (formerly Garden Market IGA)
Rona
Walmart
Cabela's
Mark's (formerly Shoppers Drug Mart)

References

External links

Preston Crossing - Rencor Developments
Harvard Property Management Inc. - Saskatoon

Buildings and structures in Saskatoon
Shopping malls in Saskatchewan
Shopping malls established in 2002